The 2019–20 season is Virtus Bologna's 91st in existence and the club's 3rd consecutive season in the top flight of Italian basketball.

Overview 
In the season 2019-20 Virtus Bologna aims to return to the highest level of the European Basketball. Despite having won the 2018-19 edition of the Basketball Champions League, Bologna decides to compete in the 2019–20 EuroCup. Followed a controversy that involved all together the club, the Italian Basketball Federation (FIP) and FIBA, in which the latter tried to convince Bologna to take part to the 2019–20 Basketball Champions League.

Bologna is aggressive also during the summer transfers, hiring top players like Miloš Teodosić and Stefan Marković and with the ambition of playing in the next year EuroLeague edition.

The season starts incredibly well, confirming the ambitious plans of the team, with a 10 games winning streak in the Serie A and the qualification to the Top 16 of the EuroCup Basketball. Bologna ends the first half of the season (16th round) on top of the standings, gaining the unofficial title of winter champions.

Unfortunately, though, the 2019-20 season was hit by the coronavirus pandemic that compelled the federation to suspend and later cancel the competition without assigning the title to anyone. Virtus Bologna ended the championship in 1st position. Followed also the early termination of the EuroCup season where Bologna had reached the quarter finals.

Kit 
Supplier: Macron / Sponsor: Segafredo

Players

Roster

Depth chart

Squad changes

In

|}

Out

|}

Confirmed

|}

Coach

Competitions

Serie A

EuroCup

Regular season

Top 16

FIBA Intercontinental Cup 
As the winner of the 2018-19 edition of the Basketball Champions League, Virtus Bologna qualified to the 2020 FIBA Intercontinental Cup. They won in the semifinal against the Argentinian team San Lorenzo de Almagro, winner of the 2019 edition of the FIBA Americas League and lost the final against the hosting team Iberostar Tenerife.

Italian Cup 
Bologna qualified to the 2020 Italian Basketball Cup having ended the first half of the season in 1st place. They lost the first match in the quarter finals against Umana Reyer Venezia.

References 

Virtus Bologna seasons
2019–20 in Italian basketball by club
2019–20 EuroCup Basketball by club